Alex Belli (born 22 December 1982 in Parma) is an Italian model, actor and television personality.

Biography 
Alessandro Gabelli, birthname of Alex Belli, is the first of four sons: he is best known for his role Jacopo Castelli from 2010 to 2016 in the daytime soap opera CentoVetrine. In 2005 he started his career as a model in London, Paris, New York City and Milan. 
In the winter of 2012 he took part (with Bobo Vieri, Andrés Gil, Anna Tatangelo, Ria Antoniou, Ariadna Romero and other contestant) in the eighth series of the Italian talent show Ballando con le Stelle hosted on Rai 1 by Milly Carlucci with Paolo Belli and his Big Band.

After his love story with the Italian model Hellen Scopel, Belli in February 2013 married the Slovakian model Katarina Raniakova: in March 2017 they divorced and shortly after the media scandal he participated (together with Stefano De Martino and others) in Selfie - Le cose cambiano, a television production of Maria De Filippi's Fascino PGT in the prime time of Canale 5 and hosted by Simona Ventura. In the winter of 2015 Belli took part (with Cecilia Rodriguez, Charlotte Caniggia, Cristina Buccino, Fanny Neguesha and other contestant) in the tenth series of the Italian reality show L'isola dei famosi hosted by Alessia Marcuzzi with Alvin in the prime time of Canale 5 and won by Le Donatella.

From 2017 to 2019 Belli had a love relationship, often at the center of the Italian gossip news, with the Moroccan model Mila Suarez; in June 2021 he married, after two years of love relationship, the Venezuelan model and actress Delia Duran, with whom Belli had participated in the second series of the Italian dating-love show Temptation Island VIP, a television production of the Maria De Filippi's agency Fascino PGT that was aired in late 2019 (September–October) in the prime time of Canale 5 and hosted by Alessia Marcuzzi.

Belli in late 2021, from September to December, took part (with Kabir Bedi, Katia Ricciarelli, Manila Nazzaro, Ainett Stephens, Jo Squillo, Aldo Montano, Carmen Russo, Francesca Cipriani, Raffaella Fico and other contestant) in the sixth series of Grande Fratello VIP hosted by Alfonso Signorini and aired on Canale 5; in this reality show the sentimental story between Belli and fellow contestant Soleil Stasi (pseudonym of Soleil Anastasia Sorge) caused a stir in the Italian media, but this is not his first "love scandal" during his roles in television: in 2015, during his participation in L'isola dei famosi 10, he caused a stir due to an alleged liaison with Cristina Buccino.

Career

Filmography

Television 
 Camera Café various directors – sitcom (Italia 1, 2007)
 CentoVetrine, various directors – soap opera (Canale 5, 2010-2014 and 2016; Rete 4, 2014–2015)
 Sacrificio d'amore, various directors – fiction (Canale 5, 2017–2018)
 Furore, directed by Alessio Inturri – fiction (Canale 5, 2018)

Cinema 
 Un'insolita vendemmia, directed by Daniele Carnacina (2013)
 The Broken Key, directed by Louis Nero (2017)
 Ciao Nina, directed by Adelmo Togliani (2019)
 Dagli occhi dell'amore, directed by Adelmo Togliani (2019)

Theater 
 La Surprise de l'amour, directed by Marco Bracco (2007)

Other activities

Advertising campaigns 
3 (2009) - with Claudia Gerini
Acqua & Sapone (2019) - with Iva Zanicchi

TV programs 
 Ballando con le stelle 8 (Rai 1, 2012)
 Capodanno Cinque (Canale 5, 2012–2013)
 L'isola dei famosi 10 (Canale 5, 2015)
 Caduta libera (Canale 5, 2015)
 Detto Fatto Night (Rai 2, 2015)
 Selfie - Le cose cambiano (Canale 5, 2017)
 Avanti un altro! - Pure di sera (Canale 5, 2017)
 Temptation Island VIP 2 (Canale 5, 2019)
 Grande Fratello VIP 6 (Canale 5, 2021)

References

External links 
 Official website
 

1982 births
Living people
Italian male models
Italian male actors
Participants in Italian reality television series